Kaumarapraayam is a 1979 Indian Malayalam film directed by K. S. Gopalakrishnan and starring Krishnachandran, Anuradha, Sukumari and Adoor Bhasi. The film has musical score by Shyam.

Cast
Krishnachandran
Anuradha
Sukumari
Adoor Bhasi
Sathaar
Kuthiravattam Pappu
Ravikumar

Soundtrack
The music was composed by Shyam and the lyrics were written by Chunakkara Ramankutty.

References

External links
 

1979 films
1970s Malayalam-language films